The seventh series of Made in Chelsea, a British structured-reality television programme, began airing on 7 April 2014 on E4. The series concluded on 16 June 2014 after 11 episodes. This is notably the only series since Series 2 where it wasn't followed by an End of Season reunion show. It is the first to feature new cast members Riley Uggla, Christianne "Tina" Stinnes and Georgia "Toff" Toffolo and the only series to include Riley's friend, Aurelie Mason-Perez and Ed "Fordy" Ford. The series included the rocky relationship between Alex and Binky after a number of revelations about Alex came to light, the isolation of Binky in her friendship group as none of them supported her decision to stay with Alex, a love triangle between Jamie, Lucy and Riley before Jamie realises he still has feelings for Lucy from their previous relationship with each other, and the brief romance between Stephanie and Stevie.

Cast

Episodes

{| class="wikitable plainrowheaders" style="width:100%; background:#fff;"
|- style="color:black"
! style="background: #FACC2E;"| SeriesNo.
! style="background: #FACC2E;"| EpisodeNo.
! style="background: #FACC2E;"| Title
! style="background: #FACC2E;"| Original airdate
! style="background: #FACC2E;"| Duration
! style="background: #FACC2E;"| UK viewers

|}

Ratings

External links

References

2014 British television seasons
Made in Chelsea seasons